Kefasi Kasiteni Chitsala (born 24 June 1994) is a Malawian long-distance runner. He competed at the 2016 Summer Olympics in the men's 5000 metres race; his time of 14:52.89 in the heats did not qualify him for the final. He was the flag bearer for Malawi in the Parade of Nations.

References

1994 births
Living people
Malawian male long-distance runners
Olympic athletes of Malawi
Athletes (track and field) at the 2016 Summer Olympics
Athletes (track and field) at the 2014 Commonwealth Games
Athletes (track and field) at the 2018 Commonwealth Games
Commonwealth Games competitors for Malawi
Athletes (track and field) at the 2019 African Games
African Games competitors for Malawi